Ponza is a comune (municipality) of the Province of Latina in the Italian region Lazio. It comprises the four islands of the western part of the Pontine archipelago in the Gulf of Gaeta (central Tyrrhenian Sea):  Ponza itself, Palmarola, Zannone, and Gavi.  The economy of Ponza is essentially based on fishing and summer tourism.

The islands

The main centre of the island is the port of Ponza, which stands towards the southern end of the eastern coast and is the seat of the commune. Other settlements include Guarini, Giancos, I Conti and Santa Maria in the centre of the island and Campo Inglese and Le Forna in the north.

It is inhabited only in the summer months and is the site of a nature reserve. The church of San Silverio recalls Pope Silverius’ death while in exile on the island.

This forms part of the Circeo National Park.

Twin towns
 Aglientu, Italy
 Ischia, Italy, since 2013

References

External links
 Official website 

Cities and towns in Lazio